Dongzhimen station is an interchange station for Line 2, Line 13 and the Capital Airport Express of the Beijing Subway.

Dongzhimen is the eastern terminus for Line 13 service. It is also the only underground station on Line 13. There are two side platforms in the Line 13 station. One is for customers to disembark and the other is for customers to get on the train. Stairs and escalators lead to the transfers to Line 2 and the Capital Airport Express.

Station Layout 
The line 2 station has an underground island platform. The line 13 and Capital Airport Express stations have underground side platforms. The line 13 platforms are located a level under the line 2 platforms, whilst the Capital Airport Express platforms are located a level under the line 13 platforms.

Exits 
There are 7 exits, lettered A, B, C, D, E, G, and H. Exits A, G, and H are accessible.

Gallery

References

External links
 

Railway stations in China opened in 1984
Beijing Subway stations in Dongcheng District